Broward Mall (previously known as Westfield Broward) is a shopping mall in Plantation, Florida.

History
The mall was opened in August 1978, with the name Broward Mall. Original anchors were Burdines, Sears, and Jordan Marsh (the latter made its debut in November), in a similar manner to Town Center at Boca Raton (1980) and Miami International Mall (1982). JCPenney was constructed a year later. 

Today, it has popular department stores and anchors including Dillard's (in the former JM/Mervyn’s spot), JCPenney, Macy's (née Burdines), and Regal Cinemas.

The mall was previously owned by the Westfield Group, which acquired it in 2007 from SPG-FCM Ventures, a 50/50 joint venture between an entity owned by Simon Property Group and funds managed by Farallon Capital Management; SPG-FCM Ventures had acquired the previous owner, Mills Corporation, earlier that year.

Mills had acquired it from Cadillac Fairview Corporation of Toronto in 2003.

On February 28, 2013, it was announced a 12-screen Regal Cinemas was opened in the mall in December 2013.

In 2015, Sears Holdings spun off 235 of its properties, including the Sears at Westfield Broward, into Seritage Growth Properties.

In 2017 the size of the Sears store was reduced by half and other shops were opened in the space, including Noire the Nail Bar; the Sears store closed in 2018. The first and the second floor of the former Sears is expected to become Powerhouse Gym and Game Time.

In June 2021, the owner Unibail-Rodamco-Westfield announced that it would be turning ownership of the mall over to its lenders after it was revealed the value of the mall had dropped below the outstanding loan on the property and that owner had stopped making payment on its loan. The Westfield name dropped shortly after the ownership of the property was transferred, returning to its original name of Broward Mall.

See also
 Town Center at Boca Raton
 The Galleria at Fort Lauderdale

References

External links
 

Shopping malls established in 1978
Shopping malls in Broward County, Florida
Plantation, Florida
1978 establishments in Florida